Sir James Fawcett (1913–1991) was a British barrister.

James Fawcett may also refer to:

James Fawcett (professor) (1752–1831), Norrisian professor at Cambridge
James Fawcett (politician), member of the Kansas House of Representatives
James Fawcett of Fawcett and Ashworth, a British design partnership